Thomas Richard Craddock, (born 13 July 1989, Holmfirth, Huddersfield) is an English first-class cricketer who is currently contracted with Essex. He is a specialist leg spin bowler.

He started the 2011 season with the Unicorns team and impressed against Essex in two 40-over games. Essex gave Craddock a two-month trial on 2 June 2011, which they later converted into a season-long trial. He was then offered and accepted a two-year 1st team contract.  He made his first-class debut against Sri Lanka in a tourist match at Chelmsford, and took his maiden first-class wicket versus Northamptonshire, also at Chelmsford.

References

1989 births
Living people
Cricketers from Huddersfield
English cricketers
Unicorns cricketers
Essex cricketers
Suffolk cricketers